Kitsune is the fourth in the series of Time Hunter novellas and features the characters Honoré Lechasseur and Emily Blandish from Daniel O'Mahony's Doctor Who novella The Cabinet of Light.
It is written by John Paul Catton.

"Kitsune" is the Japanese for fox and the book references the Japanese folklore around foxes.

The novella is also available in a limited edition hardback, signed by the author

(The series is not formally connected to the Whoniverse.)

External links
 Telos Publishing - Kitsune

Time Hunter
2004 novels